The Bowenfels rail viaducts are a series of heritage-listed railway viaducts and railway bridges over Farmers Creek on the Main Western line in Bowenfels, City of Lithgow, New South Wales, Australia. It was designed in two stages, by John Whitton as the Engineer-in-Chief for Railways, in 1870; and by engineering staff of New South Wales Government Railways in 1921; and was built from 1870 to 1921. It is also known as Farmers Creek viaducts. The property is owned by RailCorp, an agency of the Government of New South Wales. It was added to the New South Wales State Heritage Register on 2 April 1999.

History 
The Farmers Creek stone railway viaduct, immediately upstream of the 1921 brick viaduct, was built for the Lithgow to Bathurst single-track railway extension, 1869 - 1875. It is one of the oldest railway arch bridges in New South Wales but was bypassed by the 1921 double-track brick arch bridges.

By the early 1900s the original single track from Bowenfels to Wallerawang was inadequate for railway operations so plans were made to duplicate that section of line and at the same time ease the grades and flatten some curves. John Whitton chose to use stone arch construction when denied sufficient funds to use imported wrought iron girders. Economic constraints forced Whitton to build single track bridges. They were progressively bypassed by double track brick arch bridges.

A major programme of similar works was begun in 1910 and continued until the mid 1920s but, because steel was an expensive import from Britain, the dominant material for bridging the many waterways was bricks, mostly from the 1912 State Brickworks at Homebush and mostly in the form of large brick arch culverts and viaducts. The quantity of bricks used in the program was enormous and the period could be aptly described as the "era of the brick arch".

The Bowenfels to Wallerawang work was delayed until after World War I.

The viaducts over Farmers Creek are accessible from a local road that was the original Great Western Highway.

Description

1870 rail viaduct
A sandstone viaduct built for the original single track Great Western Railway over Farmers Creek west of Bowenfels Railway Station. The piers are solid stone, founded at shallow depth into rock. By this arrangement the ballasted tracks are drained and do not get water logged. There is a low stone parapet wall on each side of the viaduct. The abutments are solid stonework.

1921 rail viaduct
A brick arch viaduct comprising six  clear spans plus brick wing walls.

Condition 

As at 16 March 2006, the viaducts are in good condition.

Heritage listing 
As at 16 March 2006, this 1870 viaduct is significant because it is one of the oldest stone arch railway viaducts in New South Wales. It is associated with John Whitton the "father of New South Wales railways", it is an impressive curved sandstone structure on the edge of historic Bowenfels, its construction contributed significantly to the subsequent railway extension to Bathurst and on to western New South Wales and when John Whitton was denied funds to continue with the expensive wrought iron girder bridges he chose the stone arch viaduct for his major bridge works, particularly for the Zig Zag east of Lithgow and the extension west to Wallerawang. It is a fine representative example of a stone arch railway viaduct and it retains its original fabric.

The 1921 viaduct has significance because, it is part of the Bowenfels to Wallerawang duplication, the last of such works dominated by brick arch construction, the curved viaducts, 1870 and 1921, are an impressive pair of structures on the outskirts of historic Bowenfels, the duplication work contributed significantly to the railway extension to Bathurst and to the continued development of Western New South Wales, for land transport to Sydney and with six  clear spans on tall brick piers, it is one of the largest brick arch structures on the New South Wales railways system. The viaduct is a good representative example of brick arch construction and retains its original fabric and structure.

Bowenfels Rail Viaducts was listed on the New South Wales State Heritage Register on 2 April 1999 having satisfied the following criteria.

The place possesses uncommon, rare or endangered aspects of the cultural or natural history of New South Wales.

This item is assessed as historically rare. This item is assessed as scientifically rare. This item is assessed as arch. rare. This item is assessed as socially rare.

See also 

Historic bridges of New South Wales
List of railway bridges in New South Wales

References

Bibliography

Attribution

External links

New South Wales State Heritage Register
Bowenfels, New South Wales
Viaducts in Australia
Railway bridges in New South Wales
Articles incorporating text from the New South Wales State Heritage Register
Arch bridges in Australia
Works of John Whitton
Bridges completed in 1870
Sandstone bridges in Australia
Main Western railway line, New South Wales